Deans Marsh is a town in Victoria, Australia, located  inland from Lorne.  At the 2016 census, Deans Marsh had a population of 269. Deans Marsh is part of the Otway Harvest Trail, with the Pennyroyal Raspberry Farm and the Gentle Annie Berry Gardens nearby. There are three wineries in the area - Blakes Estate, Dinny Goonan and Gosling Creek. Also located in Deans Marsh is Yan Yan Gurt West, a sheep farm known for its 1880s woolshed and innovative practices in regenerative agriculture and agroforestry.

History
Deans Marsh Post Office opened on 3 November 1866.

The Forrest railway line, which branched from the Warrnambool line at Birregurra, was opened to Deans Marsh on 19 December 1889, and was extended to Forrest on 5 June 1891. The line was closed on 4 March 1957.

On Ash Wednesday 1983, a fire started at Deans Marsh, which spread rapidly, becoming a huge blaze which razed a considerable area of the Victoria's Surfcoast, destroying a large number of houses in Barwon Downs, Lorne, Fairhaven, Aireys Inlet, and Anglesea, and resulted in the deaths of three people.

Notable people
Deans Marsh is the birthplace of the renowned Wagnerian soprano Marjorie Lawrence (1907–1979).

References

Towns in Victoria (Australia)
Surf Coast Shire